A cooler is a cool box; a device, container, or room that cools or keeps its contents cool.

Cooler may also refer to:

Alternate terms for
Refrigerator
Prison
Bouncer (doorman)

Industry and technology
Evaporative cooler, a type of humidifier used in place of an air conditioner
Cooler (oil), a radiator to cool engine oil in an engine
Computer cooler, the system for cooling of computer components
Laptop cooler, a pad or mat for cooling laptop or notebook computers
Intercooler, an air-to-air or air-to-liquid heat exchange device

Entertainment and recreation
The Cooler, a 2003 American film
The Cooler (night club), a music and performance venue in New York City
Cooler (Dragon Ball), a fictional character in Dragonball Z movies 
The Cooler, a 1974 spy novel by George Markstein
Cooler (or C**ler), a 1996 album by Collapsed Lung
Cooler, in poker terminology, a strong poker hand that loses to a stronger one

Food and beverage
Wine cooler, an alcoholic beverage made from wine and fruit juice
Water cooler, a device that cools and dispenses water
Boston cooler, ginger ale and vanilla ice cream
Sherbet cooler, sherbet, vanilla syrup, and seltzer water

See also
Chiller (disambiguation)
Air conditioning